The 1991 Ottawa Rough Riders finished 3rd place in the East Division with a 7–11 record. They were defeated in the East Semi-Final by the Winnipeg Blue Bombers.

Offseason

CFL draft

Preseason

Regular season

Season standings

Regular season

Schedule

Postseason

Awards and honours

1991 CFL All-Stars
None

References

Ottawa Rough Riders seasons